Talance Sawyer (born June 14, 1976) is a former American football defensive end in the National Football League (NFL). He was drafted by the Minnesota Vikings in the sixth round of the 1999 NFL Draft. He played college football at UNLV.

1976 births
Living people
People from Bastrop, Louisiana
Players of American football from Louisiana
American football defensive ends
UNLV Rebels football players
Minnesota Vikings players